One Fast Move is an upcoming American action film written and directed by Kelly Blatz and starring KJ Apa.

Cast
KJ Apa
Eric Dane
Maia Reficco
Edward James Olmos
Austin North

Production
On June 21, 2022, it was announced that Apa was cast in the film.  On June 28, 2022, it was announced that Dane was cast and that filming began in Atlanta.  In August 2022, it was announced that Reficco, Olmos and North were added to the cast.

References

External links
 

Upcoming films
Films shot in Atlanta